Aks or AKS may refer to:

Arts and entertainment
 Aks (2001 film), a 2001 Indian Hindi supernatural thriller 
 Aks (2018 film), a 2018 Pakistani horror film
 Aks (album), released by Lucky Ali in 2000
 Aks (TV series), a 2012 Pakistani drama

Companies
 AKS Inc, an aircraft propeller manufacturer
 AKS (company), a Japanese talent agency, headquartered in Tokyo, Japan
 AK Steel Holding Company, a US steel manufacturer (NYSE:AKS)

World War II
 Aks 13000, or Aks 13, part of the Norwegian resistance movement in World War II
 Army Kinematograph Service, a World War II British unit
 General stores issue ship, US Navy hull classification symbol AKS

Other
 Alkenylsuccinic anhydrides used in papermaking
 Academic Karelia Society, a Finnish activist organization, 1922–1944
 Academy of Korean Studies, a South Korean research and educational institute
 Ajtai–Komlós–Szemerédi sorting network, a mathematical sorting algorithm
 Aks, a metathesis of "ask" in African American Vernacular, and other forms of English
 AKS primality test, a deterministic primality-proving algorithm
 AKS-47, a variant of the AK-47 assault rifle
 AKS Lytham, an Independent School, Lancashire, UK
 EMS Synthi AKS, an analog synthesizer
 Politiets Aktionsstyrke, a Danish special-task police force